Sir John Dykes Bower  (13 August 190529 May 1981) was an English cathedral organist who served in Truro Cathedral, Durham Cathedral and St Paul's Cathedral.

Background
Bower was born in Gloucester into a musical family, a descendant of the hymn writer John Bacchus Dykes. He was one of four brothers, including Stephen Dykes Bower, who became a famous church architect.

He was educated at Cheltenham College and studied organ under Sir Herbert Brewer. He was an organ scholar at Corpus Christi College, Cambridge, where he was the John Stewart Rannoch scholarship in sacred music.

Church musician
Bower was the organist and choirmaster at  St Paul's Cathedral for more than 30 years, from 1936 to his retirement in 1968. Following his death in 1981, he was eulogised as "an austere perfectionist with a strong feeling for the big occasion." Major services he played included the Thanksgiving service after the Second World War and at the state funeral for Sir Winston Churchill.

He was also a sub-conductor at the coronations of both King George VI and Queen Elizabeth II. In 1953, he toured North America with the St Paul's choir and conducted a concert at the White House before President Dwight D. Eisenhower.

From 1936 to 1969, Bower also served as organ professor at the Royal College of Music and was associate director of the Royal School of Church Music.

Together with G.H.Knight, he co-edited the "revised edition" of Hymns Ancient and Modern, which was published in 1950.

Career
He was organist of:
Truro Cathedral, 1926–1929
New College, Oxford, 1929–1933
Durham Cathedral, 1933–1936
St Paul's Cathedral, 1936–1968

References

1905 births
1981 deaths
People from Gloucester
English classical organists
British male organists
Cathedral organists
Hymnal editors
Alumni of Corpus Christi College, Cambridge
People educated at Cheltenham College
Organists of New College, Oxford
Knights Bachelor
Commanders of the Royal Victorian Order
Musicians awarded knighthoods
20th-century classical musicians
20th-century English musicians
20th-century organists
20th-century British male musicians
Male classical organists